Spejbl and Hurvínek Theatre (S+H) is a puppet theatre located in Prague, Czech Republic. Founded in 1930 by puppeteer Josef Skupa, Spejbl and Hurvínek was the first professional puppet theatre established in Czechoslovakia and the present-day Czech Republic.

Helena Štáchová, a puppeteer who played the well known roles of Manicka and Mrs Katerina in the company, served as the head of Spejbl and Hurvínek from 1996 until her death in 2017, following Miloš Kirschner (1956/1966-1996) and founder Josef Skupa (1930-1956). In 2008, a court awarded Štáchová the right to use the popular Spejbl and Hurvínek puppet characters after an eight-year legal dispute, which allowed the S+H Theatre to continue its programs.

References

Theatres in Prague
Puppet theaters
Theatre in the Czech Republic
Theatres completed in 1930
1930 establishments in Czechoslovakia
20th-century architecture in the Czech Republic